Adhanakottai is a village in the Orathanadu taluk of Thanjavur district, Tamil Nadu, India.

Demographics 
As per the 2001 census, Adhanakottai had a total population of 1664 with 796 males and 868 females. The sex ratio was 1090. The literacy rate was 66.51.

It has received the award "model village" from the president Abdul Kalam. The main occupation of Adhanakottai residents is agriculture, dairy.

References 
 

Villages in Thanjavur district